Mamadou Doumbia (born 28 December 1995) is a malian Malian football defender who plays for Young African SC.

References

1995 births
Living people
Malian footballers
Mali international footballers
Stade Malien players
Association football defenders
21st-century Malian people
Mali A' international footballers
2020 African Nations Championship players
2022 African Nations Championship players